Grade cricket, also known as Premier Cricket is the name of the senior inter-club or district cricket competitions in each of the Australian states and territories.  The term may refer to:

Victorian Premier Cricket
NSW Premier Cricket
Queensland Premier Cricket
Western Australian Premier Cricket
South Australian Premier Cricket
Cricket Tasmania Premier League
Darwin & District Grade Cricket
ACT Premier Cricket

See also

 Australian national cricket team
 Australia national women's cricket team
 Cricket in Australia
The Grade Cricketer

References

http://www.cricketweb.net/forum/threads/can-someone-tell-me-about-grade-cricket.2293/

External links

Australian domestic cricket competitions